Mangalyam Thanthunanena is a 2018 Indian Malayalam-language satire film directed by Soumya Sadanandan and written by Tony Madathil, starring Kunchacko Boban and Nimisha Sajayan. The film was released on 20 September 2018.

Plot 
Roy and Clara are newly married couples, Roy is an irresponsible spendthrift who has trouble managing his finances. Clara's nature is exactly the opposite. when Roy comes home from Dubai for his wedding, he learns that he has been terminated from his job. The marriage was fine during the first three months or so, but the going gets tough as Roy wants money urgently to pay off his debts.
Clara suggests that he joins for work at her wealthy dad's bank or about asking him for some financial help. But Roy is egoistic to do that. He wants Clara to give her ornaments to pledge for a bank loan or to sell it. When she refuses, their relationship gets shaky. The film revolves around the events that unfold following this crisis how he manages to sort things out.

Cast 

 Kunchacko Boban as Roy
 Nimisha Sajayan as Clara, Roy's wife
 Hareesh Perumanna as Shamzudheen
 Shanthi Krishna as Thresiyamma, Roy's mother
 Vijayaraghavan as Avarachan, Clara's father
 Alencier Ley Lopez as Prof. Kuruvila Eliyas
 Leona Lishoy as Susan Thomas
 Sunil Sukhada as Palisha Rappayi
 Salim Kumar as Father Kuriyakose Tharayill
 Chempil Ashokan as Koora 
 Rony David as George, Roy's brother-in-law
 Pauly Valsan as Thressiyama's mother
 Soubin Shahir as guest appearance
 Kochu Preman as Babu
 Gokulan as Kuttappayi
 Sankar Induchoodan as Titto
 Mamukoya as Kuriyan paraykal
 Jomon K John as Thamara Shibu
 Molly Kannamaly as Valsa
 Gayathri Varsha as Korah's wife
 Baby

Production
The film marks the feature film directorial debut of Soumya Sadanandan after the documentary Chembai: My Discovery of a Legend. Sathanandan described the film as "a family satire reminiscent of the old Balachandra Menon films".

Release
The film was released on 20 September 2018.

Reception
The Times of India rated it 3 out of 5 and said that "It is a simple film without much to boast off". New Indian Express rated the film 3 out of 5, saying "This is a film that doesn't aim too high. It is content with being what it really is: a simple, old-fashioned, and feel-good family entertainer". Filmibeat rated it 3 out of 5 and said that " The film will take us back to the stories that we have seen in the 80s/90s, but it is set in today's time. The film might be clichéd at parts but it delivers what it intended and it has some genuinely good moments to offer for the audiences.

References

External links
 

2010s Malayalam-language films
Indian family films
Indian satirical films